Pari Mordeh-ye Bala (also Romanized as Parī Mordeh-ye Bālā; also known as Pari Mordeh) is a village in Gerit Rural District, Papi District, Khorramabad County, Lorestan Province, Iran. At the 2006 census, its population was 111, in 22 families.

References 

Towns and villages in Khorramabad County